Bell Acres is a borough in Allegheny County, Pennsylvania, United States, part of the Pittsburgh Metro Area. The population was 1,505 at the 2020 census.

Geography

Surrounding neighborhoods
Bell Acres has six borders, including Economy in Beaver County to the north and northwest, Franklin Park to the east, Sewickley Hills to the southeast, Sewickley Heights to the south, and Edgeworth and Leet Township to the southwest.

Education
Bell Acres is served by the Quaker Valley School District.

Government and politics

The Borough Council is a seven-member body of lawmakers. Regular Council Meetings are held the second Monday of each month at 6:00 p.m. at the Big Sewickley Creek Fire Hall.

The Mayor of Bell Acres is Kenneth Alvania (D).

History
Bell Acres was settled circa 1808.  The area was originally established as Sewickley Township on June 28, 1854.  Bell Acres was incorporated as its own borough on March 14, 1960. The community was named after Bell Farms.

Demographics

As of the census of 2000, there were 1,382 people, 520 households, and 412 families residing in the borough. The population density was 265.3 people per square mile (102.4/km2). There were 540 housing units at an average density of 103.6 per square mile (40.0/km2). The racial makeup of the borough was 95.66% White, 1.09% African American, 0.65% Native American, 1.52% Asian, 0.29% from other races, and 0.80% from two or more races. Hispanic or Latino of any race were 0.22% of the population.

There were 520 households, out of which 32.1% had children under the age of 18 living with them, 70.8% were married couples living together, 6.0% had a female householder with no husband present, and 20.6% were non-families. 18.8% of all households were made up of individuals, and 10.2% had someone living alone who was 65 years of age or older. The average household size was 2.66 and the average family size was 3.04.

In the borough the population was spread out, with 24.1% under the age of 18, 4.8% from 18 to 24, 24.9% from 25 to 44, 28.1% from 45 to 64, and 18.0% who were 65 years of age or older. The median age was 43 years. For every 100 females there were 97.7 males. For every 100 females age 18 and over, there were 101.3 males.

The median income for a household in the borough was $61,094, and the median income for a family was $70,288. Males had a median income of $55,625 versus $29,375 for females. The per capita income for the borough was $41,202. About 1.9% of families and 3.1% of the population were below the poverty line, including 4.3% of those under age 18 and 2.8% of those age 65 or over.

References

Populated places established in 1808
Boroughs in Allegheny County, Pennsylvania